Kırşehir Museum is a museum in Kırşehir, Turkey. The museum is on Ahi Evran street in Kırşehir.

In 1936 a mosque was used to keep the ethnographical items. But the museum was not established until 1997. Kaman-Kalehöyük excavations was instrumental in establishing the museum.

The museum was rebuilt in 2008 with the economic and cultural cooperation of Turkish and Japanese governments. It was formally opened to public on 10 July 2010, and it preserves and displays the many artifacts from the archaeological excavations at Kaman-Kalehöyük.

The two storey   museum building is a part of Kırşehir Culture complex which was previously used as an art gallery. There are two exhibition halls and one stock room.

The artifacts in the museum span from early Copper Age to present age. The archaeologic items and coins are exhibited in the ground floor. The ethnographic items are exhibited in the upper floor. Among the ethnographical items a special section is reserved for Ahi Evren of Kırşehir, a Muslim preacher who was known as the founder of Ahis fraternity in the 13th century.

In the museum, the artifacts from Kalehöyük, Yassıhöyük and Büklükale excavations are exhibited. These excavations were carried out by archeologists of the Japanese-Anatolian Archeology Institute. As a result, the museum collection has now reached around 5,000 items.

The world's oldest ironware was excavated at Kaman-Kalehöyük, and the evidence is presented at the museum. Also recently, what may be the oldest glass in the world has been found at Kaman. This glass is estimated to be 3600-year-old [1600 BC].

See also
Tomb of Ahi Evren

References

External links
 Kırşehir Kaman Kalehöyük Archaeological Museum turkishmuseums.com
 23 May 2022 - Promoting Kaman in Turkey at Archeological Museum where "the world's oldest ironware and glass" are exhibited. Japan International Cooperation Agency

Buildings and structures in Kırşehir Province
Museums in Turkey
1997 establishments in Turkey
Tourist attractions in Kırşehir Province
Museums established in 1997